Poikilogyne is a genus of flowering plants belonging to the family Melastomataceae.

Its native range is Borneo, New Guinea.

Species:

Poikilogyne arfakensis 
Poikilogyne bicolor 
Poikilogyne biporosa 
Poikilogyne callantha 
Poikilogyne carinata 
Poikilogyne cordifolia 
Poikilogyne cornuta 
Poikilogyne diastematica 
Poikilogyne furfuracea 
Poikilogyne grandiflora 
Poikilogyne hirta 
Poikilogyne hooglandii 
Poikilogyne lakekamuensis 
Poikilogyne macrophylla 
Poikilogyne magnifica 
Poikilogyne mucronato-serrulata 
Poikilogyne multiflora 
Poikilogyne neglecta 
Poikilogyne parviflora 
Poikilogyne paucifolia 
Poikilogyne pentamera 
Poikilogyne robusta 
Poikilogyne roemeri 
Poikilogyne rubro-suffiusa 
Poikilogyne rugosa 
Poikilogyne setosa 
Poikilogyne velutina 
Poikilogyne villosa

References

Melastomataceae
Melastomataceae genera